Jorge Gómez (born 3 May 1956) is a Cuban former cyclist. He competed in the team time trial event at the 1976 Summer Olympics.

References

External links
 

1956 births
Living people
Cuban male cyclists
Olympic cyclists of Cuba
Cyclists at the 1976 Summer Olympics
Place of birth missing (living people)